The Mazda B-series engine - not to be confused with the Mazda B-Series truck - is a small-sized, iron-block, inline four-cylinder with belt-driven SOHC and DOHC valvetrain ranging in displacement from 1.1 to 1.8 litres. It was used from front-wheel drive economy applications to the turbocharged full-time 4WD 323 GTX and rear-wheel drive Miata as well as numerous other models. The Mazda B-series is a "non-interference" design, meaning that breakage of its timing belt does not result in damage to valves or pistons, because the opening of the valves, the depth of the combustion chamber and (in some variants) the shaping of the piston crown allow sufficient clearance for the open valves in any possible piston position.

B1
 B1 - (68.0x78.4 mm) - came only as a SOHC 8-valve. It was available in the 1987-1989 Mazda 121 and later model Kia Sephia in European and Asian markets. A fuel-injected variant was used in select European market 1991-1995 Mazda 121s

BJ
The  BJ engine (78.0x67.5 mm) was a DOHC 16-valve engine, used only in the Japanese market Ford Festiva GT, GT-X, and GT-A models (1986.10-1993.01, GT-A from March 1991). It generates  at 7000 rpm and is equipped with Mazda's "EGi" single-point fuel injection. It is a short-stroke version of the B5/B6 engines.

B3

 B3 – (71.0×83.6 mm).  It was available in SOHC variants and was found in the Kia-built 1988–1993 Ford Festiva, the 1987–1989 Mazda Familia and its derivatives, as well as the Mazda 121 (also known as Autozam Revue) (54 hp and 72 hp version), and the 1987–1989 Ford Laser, and 1994–1997 Ford Aspire. Later variants were used in the Mazda Demio subcompact until 2002.

Fuel Injected Engine:
Horsepower:   at 5000 rpm
Torque:  at 3000 rpm

Carbureted Engine:
Horsepower:  

 1988–2000 Ford Festiva/Mazda 121
 1985–2020 Kia Pride
 Autozam Revue/Mazda 121
 1986-1989 Mazda Familia/323
 1995-2002 Mazda Demio
 1994-1997 Ford Aspire/Kia Avella
 1987-1989 Ford Laser
 1991-1993 Sao Penza
 2000-2005 Kia Rio

B5

8-valve SOHC
 B5 - (78.0x78.4 mm) - The SOHC 8-valve B5 upped the displacement to 1.5 L and was found in the 1987-1989 Mazda Familia, the 1987-1989 Ford Laser. It was also fitted to the Mazda Étude coupé and fifth-generation BF-series Familia Wagon, as it continued in production until 1994 along the new BG.

16-valve SOHC
There was also a 16-valve, SOHC B5-MI version of the B5, usually fitted with single-point fuel injection ("EGi"). This engine was mainly used in the Japanese domestic market. The B5-ME, equipped with electronic fuel injection, was used by Kia for several of their cars as well as in the Mazda Demio.

16-valve DOHC
 B5D - (78.0x78.4 mm) - A Japanese-only variant of the B5 with fuel injection and revised head/intake system. The Timor S515i also used a B5D, with 110 PS at 5,500 rpm and 145 Nm at 4,400 rpm without variable valve timing and with a 9.2:1 compression ratio. The B5D was also found in the Autozam AZ-3, a Japanese market version of the Mazda MX-3, where it produced . The Kia Rio from 2000-2005 also has the B5 motor, but with a different bore/stroke ratio to all others (75.5mm bore, 83.4mm stroke, 1493cc total).

B6
 B6 — (78.0x83.6 mm) — This was a bored-out version of the B3. The 16-valve SOHC B6 was found in the 1985-1989 and 1990-1994 Mazda 323, 1991-1993 Mazda MX-3 the 1987-1990 Mercury Tracer, and the 1985-1990 Ford Laser. The 16-valve DOHC B6 was also found in the 1994-1998 Ford Laser KJ/KL, 1997-2004 Kia Sephia, Kia Shuma, 2000-2004 Kia Spectra and 2000-2005 Kia Rio (for export markets).

In Japan, the United Kingdom, and Australia a fuel-injected version called the B6F was available. In Europe, the B6 also came in a 16-valve DOHC version, mostly found in the Mazda 323 BG and 323F BG models from 1989 to 1994. This engine was the same 1.6 liter fuel-injected, but with two camshafts and 88 hp. Kia's version of the B6 (16-valve DOHC) had a marginally shorter stroke (at 83.4 mm), for a total displacement of 1,594 cc. This engine was used in the Rio, Sephia II, and Shuma.

8-valve SOHC
 1985-1989 and 1990-1994 Mazda 323
 1994-1996 Kia Sephia (for export markets only: DE, USA)
 1987-1990 Mercury Tracer
 1985-1990 Ford Laser KC/KE

16-valve SOHC
 1991-1993 Mazda MX-3
 1989-1994 Mazda 323 BG
 1989-1994 Mazda 323F BG/Mazda Astina BG
 1989-1994 Ford Laser KF/KH

16-valve DOHC
 1989-1993 Mazda Miata
 1993-1999 Mazda Xedos 6
 2000-2005 Kia Rio (for export markets only)
 1997-2003 Mazda Familia/ Mazda Etude (South Africa)

B6-2E
 B6-2E - (78.0x83.6 mm), also known as B6-ME - This was a variant of the B6-E with a SOHC  16-valve cylinder head.

B6T
 B6T - (78.0x83.6 mm) - The ubiquitous turbocharged, fuel-injected and intercooled 16-valve DOHC B6, released in 1985 and used in numerous models worldwide including the 1985-1989 Mazda Familia BFMR/BFMP (turbo), 1985-1989 Ford Laser TX3 turbo, and 1991-1994 Mercury Capri XR2. This engine was most commonly found mated to a 4WD drivetrain although FWD models were also available.

Power and torque outputs varied across markets due to emission and fuel standards. The Japanese version was slightly more powerful, producing  and  due to better intake manifold design and its ability to run 100 octane fuel.

B6D

 B6D - (78.0x83.6 mm) - The same strengthened and fuel-injected 16-valve DOHC B6 but with higher compression, no turbo, and the first Mazda engine to feature Variable Inertia Charge System (VICS). Most commonly found in the 1985-1988 Japanese market Familias, Études and Lasers, this engine was updated in 1989 with revised compression, heads and intake system  (in a similar vein to the B5 DOHC) for the 1989-1991 Familia and Laser, then further refined for the 1991-1994 Mercury Capri and 1994 to 1996, second Generation Mazda MX-3 RS. The third-generation B6D features an alloy cam cover, a VLIM (VICS) intake, had a 9:1 compression ratio and produced 107 hp (79 kW).

 1989-91 Mazda Familia
 1991-1994 Mercury Capri
 1994-96 Mazda MX-3
 1994-1996 Ford Laser
 1985-1988 Ford Laser, Études, Mazda Familia
 1995-1997 Kia Sephia

B6ZE(RS)

 B6ZE(RS) - (78x83.6 mm) - Developed for the Mazda MX-5/Miata (1989–05) and Mazda Familia sedan GS/LS Full Time 4WD (JP only, 1994–1998). The engine uses a DOHC 16-valve alloy head with a lightened crankshaft and flywheel to allow a 7,200 rpm redline. An aluminum sump with cooling fins is an unusual feature of this engine.

PN27

 PN27 - (78x90 mm) The PN27 is a 1720cc B6 based diesel motor used in the 1986-1989 Mazda Familia.

PN46
 PN46 - (78x90 mm) The PN46 is a 1720cc B6 based diesel motor used in the 1987-1989 Mazda Familia

B8
The  B8 (sometimes "BP") is not just a bored and stroked B6.  Rather, it uses a new block with widened cylinder spacing.  The bore is 83 mm and the stroke is 85 mm. This SOHC engine was used in various Australian Mazda 323s, the American 1990-1994 Mazda Protege, and in Canadian variants of the 323 hatchback. It came with four valves per cylinder (B8-ME or BP-ME). It features hydraulic lash adjusters, a belt-driven cam, an 8.9:1 compression ratio, a 6,000 rpm redline, and multi-port fuel injection. Power outputs are:

, 111 lb-ft (U.S./Canadian market)
 at 5,300 rpm,  at 4,000 rpm (European markets)

BP
This Inline-four engine was called BP-ZE by Mazda engineers and featured a forged crankshaft, piston oil squirters, a structural aluminium oil pan with cooling fins, a 7,000 rpm redline, and Variable Inertia Charging System (VICS) which is activated by a control solenoid at high rpm to increase horsepower in the upper rev range. The engine is a favourite for both N/A and turbo motoring enthusiasts for its robust design, materials and construction. This particular variant can be found in the following vehicles:

 1989-1994 Mazda Familia GT (European & Australian Market)
 1989-1994 Ford Laser TX3 (Australian Market)
 1994-1998 Ford Laser KJ GLXi (Australian Market)
 1994-1998 Mazda Artis "LX" VICS jm1 (South America Market)
 1990-1994 Mazda Protege LX (with VICS)
 1995-1998 Mazda Protege ES (Australian Market: 1994-1998 323 Protege SE)
 1990 Mazda Infini
 1990-1991 and 1993 Mazda Protege GT (Canadian Market)
 1990-1993 Mazda 323 (European Market)
 1991-1996 Ford Escort GT and LX-E
 1991-1996 Mercury Tracer LTS
 1995-1997 Kia Sephia RS, LS, GS
 1994-1998 Mazda Familia (Japanese Market)
 1994-1998 Mazda Lantis
 1994-1997 Mazda MX-5/Miata (did not have VICS until 1999)
 1996-1998 Suzuki Cultus Crescent/Baleno/Esteem

There is also a non-performance SOHC version that is most easily recognized by its black stamped-steel oil pan. It also features a cast crankshaft, no oil squirters, a plastic oil pickup tube and less aggressive camshafts. It is found in the 1995-1998 Mazda Protege ES.

BPT

The BPT is a turbocharged and intercooled variant of the BP.

It featured an IHI RHB5 VJ20 turbocharger, sidemount intercooler, 330 cc blacktop injectors (high impedance). The BPT versions of the Familia and Laser were only available in AWD models, and featured a viscous LSD centre and rear differentials.

Applications:
 1989-1994 Mazda Familia GT-X (Japan)
 1989-1994 Ford Laser TX3 turbo (Australia)
 1989-1994 Mazda 323 
 1989-1994 Ford Laser GT-X

BPD
The mazda BPD engine (also commonly referred to as a BP2) was a revamp of the original BP engine (sometimes called BP1 for clarity's sake). It featured a larger crank nose, larger piston oil squirters, a main bearing support plate, better flowing inlet and exhaust ports. This was also the base engine for the Mazda Familia GT-R and GT-Ae. It is commonly known as the 'big turbo' variant as it utilised a much larger IHI RHF6CB water-cooled turbocharger (vj23). The BPD was used as the basis for the engine, with changes such as sodium-filled exhaust valves, larger (and front-mounted) intercooler, larger (440 cc) low impedance fuel injectors and stronger engine internals helping to up the performance of the engine to produce 209 hp (156 kW) and 184 lb·ft (255 N·m). The VICS system of the N/A BP has been removed, as well as the boost cut from the ecu. This engine was designed to power Mazda to a world rally championship win, and was thus used in the limited production Mazda Familia GT-R (2,200 built) and GTAe (300 built).

BP-4W

The 1999 MX-5 uses a modified BP, the BP-4W, which replaces the old hall effect dual Cam Angle Sensor unit mounted at the back of the exhaust cam with two separate Hall Effect units at the front - one on the intake cam gear and one mounted on the oil pump, to the side of the crankshaft pulley. It also has an improved intake system (a better flowing cylinder head because of the angle of the intake ports being changed). There was also a switch from the earlier problematic hydraulic lifters to solid lifters. The engine initially produced 140 hp at 6500 rpm, and 119 lb·ft at 5000 rpm. The Mazdaspeed turbo engine has no VICS, but does have VTCS which is often mistaken to be related to VICS.

Applications:
 1999-2000 Mazda MX-5/Roadster/Miata
 2004-2005 Mazdaspeed MX-5

BP-Z3
In 2001, Mazda introduced the still  BP-Z3 (also called BP-VE) variant of the BP engine. It features S-VT variable valve timing on the intake side, no more VICS, but there is Variable Tumble Control System (VTCS) in the BP-Z3. A similar looking but effectively very different set of valves that restrict the intake on cold start for emissions purposes, rather than the torque enhancing set of partial butterflies that increase velocity that are used in VICS.  This was found in the 2001+ Miata. The Z family is an evolution of this engine.

In Australia, a version of this engine produced 210 hp (157 kW) and 206 lb·ft (280 N·m) in the Mazda MX-5 SP.

See also
 Mazda engines

References, links

 1981-1994 Ford Laser engine guide (applies to Mazda Familia as well)

B
Straight-four engines
Gasoline engines by model